The Intermediate Geographic Region of Ipatinga (code 3105) is one of the 13 intermediate geographic regions in the Brazilian state of Minas Gerais and one of the 134 of Brazil, created by the National Institute of Geography and Statistics (IBGE) in 2017.

It comprises 44 municipalities, distributed in 3 immediate geographic regions:

 Immediate Geographic Region of Ipatinga.
 Immediate Geographic Region of Caratinga.
 Immediate Geographic Region of João Monlevade.

References 

Geography of Minas Gerais